The Clerk of the New York Court of Appeals was one of the statewide elected officials in New York from 1847 to 1870. He was also ex officio a clerk of the New York Supreme Court. The office was created by the New York State Constitution of 1846. The first Clerk was elected at the 1847 New York special judicial election, and took office on July 5, 1847, when the Court of Appeals succeeded the Court for the Correction of Errors and the Court of Chancery.

List

Notes

Sources
The New York Civil List compiled by Franklin Benjamin Hough, Stephen C. Hutchins and Edgar Albert Werner (1867; page 424)

 
Legal history of New York (state)
1847 establishments in New York (state)